Emil Henry "Dutch" Levsen (April 29, 1898 – March 12, 1972) was a Major League Baseball pitcher who played for six seasons. He spent his entire career with the Cleveland Indians, pitching for them from 1923 to 1928. He pitched in 80 career games, finishing with a 21–26 record.

On August 28, 1926 Levsen became the last pitcher to win both games of a doubleheader, hurling two 9 inning games back to back, winning 6-1 and 5-1. Levsen is also the last pitcher to throw two nine-inning complete games on the same day.

References

External links

1898 births
1972 deaths
Major League Baseball pitchers
Cleveland Indians players
Baseball players from Iowa
Iowa State Cyclones baseball players